Bhag Corona is an online browser game created by independent developers Akram Tariq Khan and Anushree Warade, who are students at Xavier School of Management (XLRI). Players play as an animted version of Indian Prime Minister Narendra Modi, shooting down the COVID-19 virus using sanitizer. The simplistic gameplay draws inspiration from the 2013 video game Flappy Bird. The game displays personal hygiene educational messages when the character misses the virus.

The game was developed during the 21-day lockdown announced in India on 25 March 2020. ShareChat, a regional social networking app, featured the game on their platform.

See also
COVID-19 pandemic in India

References

External links

2020 video games
Browser games
Educational video games
Medical video games
Video games developed in India
Video games based on real people
Narendra Modi
COVID-19 pandemic in India